Anastasya Paramzina (born 30 May 1998) is a Russian chess player. She received the FIDE title of Woman Grandmaster (WGM) in 2017.

Chess career
Anastasya Paramzina is Moscow chess school student. Anastasya Paramzina repeatedly represented Russia at the European Youth Chess Championships and World Youth Chess Championships in different age groups, where she reached the best result in 2012 in Prague when she won a silver medal in the girl's U14 age group. In 2013, Anastasya Paramzina played for Russia in the European Girls' U18 Team Chess Championship. In 2017, in World Girls U-20 Championship she was second, behind only the winner Zhansaya Abdumalik.

In 2017, in Riga she participated in Women's European Individual Chess Championship. In September 2020, she won Moscow City Women's Chess Championship.

References

External links
 
 
 

1998 births
Living people
Sportspeople from Moscow
Russian female chess players
Chess woman grandmasters